Udayakumar T is a sound designer and audiographer who has worked in more than 300 films, primarily in Tamil cinema.

Early life

Udayakumar. T is an alumnus of MGR Govt. Film & Television Institute, Taramani, Chennai. After graduation (in 1998) he went on to assist audiographer Deepan Chatterjee at Director Priyadarshan's 4 Frames Sound Company before venturing out independently. He now works in Knack Studios, Chennai. He made his debut as independent sound designer/engineer with Daas in 2005.

Career

Udayakumar has worked with both veterans and new generation directors including P.Vasu, R.Sunderrajan, Sundar.C, Hari, Pa.Ranjith, Siruthai Siva, Vetrimaran, M. Sasikumar, Bala, Samuthirakani, M. Rajesh, Ponram etc. His notable works includes Asuran, K 13, Kabali, Visaranai, Peranmai, Vivegam, Chennai 600028 II, Madras, Demonte Colony etc. . His sound mix for Asuran, played an important role in the commercial success of the film and was lauded for his work. Apart from sound designing and mixing, recently he made his foray into another domain, by doing script doctoring for the Tamil Film K 13.

Partial filmography

Daas
Peranmai
Madras
Demonte Colony
Aranmanai
Maan Karathe
Vella Ila Pattathari
Pannaiyarum Padminiyum
Idhu Kathirvelan Kadhal
Vallinam
Bramman
Nimirndhu Nil
Thalaivan
Yennamo Yetho
Un Samayal Araiyil
Enna Satham Indha Neram
Poojai
Thirudan Police
Naiigal Jaakirathai
Meaghamann
Aambala
Vai Raja Vai
Vaalu
Vasuvum Saravananum Onna Padichavanga
Naanum Rowdy Dhan
Uppu Karuvadu
Thangamagan
Sathuran
Puli
Rajini Murugan
Aarathu Sinam
Sethupathi
Vetrivel
Ko2
Marudhu
Appa
Dharma Durai
Wagha
Rekka
Maveeran Kittu
Pazhaya Vannarapettai
Veera Sivaji
Kabali
Vedalam
Chennai 600028 II
Eeti
Singam 3
Kuttram 23
Yaakkai
Dora
Pa Pandi
7 Naatkal
Brindhavanam
Nenjil Thunivirundhal
Kodiveeran
Ulkuthu
Sketch
Thaanaa Serundha Koottam
Bhaagamathie
Madura Veeran
Kalakalappu 2
Veera
Iruttu Araiyil Murattu Kuththu
Tik Tik Tik
Semma Botha Aagathey
Ghajinikanth
60 Vayadu Maaniram
Annanukku Jai
Saamy Square
Jarugandi
Kaatrin Mozhi'''Adanga Maru'Silukkuvarupatti SingamMiruthanVivegamVisaranaiViswasamAgnyaathavaasiGoodachariMerku Thodarchi MalaiVada ChennaiVantha Rajavthaan VaruvenKanne kalaimaaneLKGThadamJuly KaatrilKanchana 3Devarattam100Mr.LocalNeeya 2SevenNenjamundu Neramaiyundu Odu RajaSuttu Pidika UtharavuThumbaaSindhubaadhDharmaprabhuRatchasiGorillaKazhugu 2Kennedy ClubViswasamK 13AadaiSaahoAruvamAsuranAdutha SaattaiDhanusu Raasi NeyargalePattasTaanaNaadodigal 2SeeruNaan SirithalIrandaam KuththuIdam Porul Yaeval''

Awards and recognition

Many movies are made on the editing Table but movies do get developed at the mixing stage too like including filling logical loopholes thanks to Uday's expertise on commercial sensibilities. He is a recipient of  Tamil Nadu State Award for  Peranmai. Also won the IIFA Award for Chennai 28 (Part 2 ) and  Behindwoods Award for Madras and Demonte Colony.

References

1975 births
Living people
Indian sound designers